Guy Emory Benjamin (born June 27, 1955) is a former American football quarterback who played six seasons in the  National Football League.

College career
Benjamin played high school football at James Monroe High School in North Hills, California and matriculated at Stanford University in 1974. He split starting time with Mike Cordova at first, but took over as full-time starter in 1976. In 1977, under coach Bill Walsh, Benjamin led Stanford to a 24-14 victory over LSU in the 1977 Sun Bowl and won both the Sammy Baugh Trophy (top passer in college football) and the W.J. Voit Memorial Trophy, (outstanding college football player on the Pacific Coast).

NFL career
Benjamin was drafted by the Miami Dolphins in the second round of the 1978 NFL Draft. He played two seasons behind Bob Griese and Don Strock, then spent one season as Archie Manning's backup with the New Orleans Saints. He was reunited with Bill Walsh when he joined the San Francisco 49ers in 1981, where he earned a Super Bowl ring as Joe Montana's backup in Super Bowl XVI. He retired in 1984 following surgery.

After football
After leaving football, Benjamin directed Athletes United for Peace, an organization founded by Olympic athletes after the U.S. boycott of the 1980 Moscow Olympics. He also founded the Sports in Society Institute at the New College of California, and directed its degree-completion program for former student-athletes.

He now lives in Hawaii, where he was offensive coordinator for the University of Hawaii football team for a while. In 1988, he was to be the head coach of the World Indoor Football League's Las Vegas Aces, but that league folded before it could get off the ground and the Aces' bid to join the Arena Football League was turned away, so that the Aces never played a game. He also coached the Hawaii Hammerheads of the Indoor Professional Football League to the league championship in 1999, the team's only season. He then became the first head coach of the IPFL's Portland Prowlers before returning to Hawaii, where he coached the minor league Hawaiian Islanders of the Arena Football League af2.

As of 2012, he is Executive Director of the Hawaii Medical College.

References

1955 births
Living people
All-American college football players
Miami Dolphins players
New Orleans Saints players
Players of American football from Los Angeles
San Francisco 49ers players
American football quarterbacks
Stanford Cardinal football players